The Aderidae, sometimes called ant-like leaf beetles, are a family of beetles that bear some resemblance to ants. The family consists of about 1,000 species in about 40 genera, of which most are tropical, although overall distribution is worldwide.

As with the Anthicidae, their heads constrict just in front of the pronotum, forming a neck, although the posterior end of the pronotum is not usually as narrow. The eyes are hairy with a granular appearance. The first two abdominal sternites are fused, and in only some groups is a suture even visible. Sizes are 1–4 mm.

As the name suggests, most adults are found on the undersides of the leaves of shrubs and trees, while larvae have been found in rotting wood, leaf litter, and nests of other insects.

, the last publication of a world catalog of the family was that of Maurice Pic in 1910.

The oldest confirmed member of the family is Gryzmalia from the mid Cretaceous Burmese amber of Myanmar.

Genera

Aderus
Agacinosia
Agenjosia
Anidorus
Ariotus
Axylophilus
Beltranosia
Candidosia
Carinatophilus
Cnopus
Cobososia
Dasytomorphus
Dusmetosia
Elonus
Emelinus
Escalerosia
Euglenes
Ganascus
Gompelia
Gonzalosia
Gymnoganascus
Hintonosia
Megaxenus
Menorosia
Mixaderus
Phytobaenus
Picemelinus
Pseudananca
Pseudanidorus
Pseudariotus
Pseudolotelus
Pseudozena
Saegerosia
Scraptogetus
Syzeton
Syzetonellus
Syzetoninus
Tokiophilus
Transrenus
Vanonus
Zarcosia
Zenascus
Zonantes

References

 Donald S. Chandler, "Aderidae", in Ross H. Arnett, Jr. and Michael C. Thomas, American Beetles (CRC Press, 2002), vol. 2

 
Polyphaga families